John Francis 'Murph' Murphy Sr. (February 22, 1923 – November 19, 2011) was an American politician.

Born in Ludlow, Vermont, he went to Black River Academy and then to Windsor Trade School. Murphy then worked as a machinist for General Electric for twenty-eight years. He was a member of the Vermont House of Representatives between 1969 and 1998 and was a Democrat. He then served as water commissioner in Ludlow. He died in Ludlow, Vermont. Murphy's funeral was held on November 23, 2011, and he was eulogized by Ralph G. Wright.

Notes

1923 births
2011 deaths
People from Ludlow (town), Vermont
Machinists
Democratic Party members of the Vermont House of Representatives
20th-century American politicians